Franko Škugor won the final against Laurent Recouderc 4–6, 6–4, 6–3.

Seeds

Draw

Finals

Top half

Bottom half

References
 Main Draw
 Qualifying Draw

Beijing International Challenger - Singles
2010 Men's Singles